The Polomka is a river in Perm Krai of Russia. It is a left tributary of the Gayva, which is a tributary of the Kama. It flows over the north-western part of Perm.

The slope of the river .

References 
 Лист карты O-40-65-В-б. Масштаб: 1 : 25 000
 Лист карты O-40-65-В-а. Масштаб: 1 : 25 000
 Игорь Мосягин Капилляры земли Пермской. Реки, которые мы не замечаем

Perm, Russia
Rivers of Perm Krai
Tributaries of the Kama